Aziz + Cucher, consisting of Anthony Aziz and Sammy Cucher, are American artists working collaboratively since meeting in graduate school in 1990 at the San Francisco Art Institute. They are considered pioneers in the field of digital imaging and post-photography, with projects exhibited at numerous international venues, including the 46th Venice Biennale in 1995, the Museo Reina Sofia in Madrid, the Los Angeles County Museum of Art and the San Francisco Museum of Modern Art.

Anthony Aziz 
Anthony Aziz was born in 1961 in Lunenburg, Massachusetts; he is third generation Lebanese American. His paternal grandparents emigrated to the U.S. from Jezzine, Lebanon.

Aziz received his BA degree from Boston College in 1983 and then went on to earn his MFA degree from the San Francisco Art Institute in 1990. He holds the titles of Professor of Fine Arts and Associate Dean of Faculty at Parsons School of Design in New York.

Sammy Cucher 
Sammy Cucher was born in 1958 in Lima, Peru, and was raised Jewish in Caracas, Venezuela. He received his BFA degree in the Experimental Theater Wing from Tisch School of the Arts at New York University in 1983 and then earned his MFA degree from San Francisco Art Institute in 1992. Cucher became a U.S. citizen in 2001 and he is a Part-Time Professor at Parsons School of Design, New York.

Career
Aziz + Cucher have worked across media including digital photography, video installation, sculpture, screen-printing and textiles. They were among the first to use Adobe Photoshop in the context of fine art photography. The resulting series of images (1992 to 2002) can be seen as a commentary and reflection on the relationship between the human body and the technological forces that shape our society. In later projects (2003 to 2006), which grew to include video installation, their concerns shifted towards the way that our perception of nature and the landscape had been augmented and modified by technological mediation. More recent projects have addressed their personal relationship to the ongoing unrest in the Middle East, as well as the absurd and often irrational forces that have shaped our financial and political realities in the aftermath of the 2008 financial crisis.

"All of their work tries to reflect on the boundaries of identity at a time when these are becoming increasingly fluid and undefined. Often a synthesis of reality and fiction, their work tries to reveal the pathologies associated with unfettered globalization, post-human conditions and the intersections between the social, the biological, and the technological. In all their projects they are searching for a visual poetics that can express both the anxieties and expectations of living in such a moment."

Work

Faith, Honor and Beauty, 1992
First exhibited at New Langton Arts in San Francisco and later at the New Museum and Jack Shainman Gallery in New York, Faith, Honor and Beauty was the first series Aziz + Cucher created together. The portraits echo the conventions of historical portrait painting using stereotypical beautiful bodies of nude men and women. Although these figures are in classical poses, they are photographed holding objects such as a portable computer, bowl of apples, and an alumninum baseball bat. In the words of Keith Seward who reviewed the work in Artforum, “they look less like androgynes than superhumans, like archetypes that become extreme caricatures of the kind of values you might hear touted at a Republican convention… the subtly ironic title “Faith, Honor & Beauty” has a rather malevolent, even fascist ring to it, no doubt this is because what are ideals to one can easily be nightmares to another.”

The Dystopia series, 1994–1995
Consists of large digitally manipulated portraits in which the orifices—eyes, mouth and nostrils—have been covered by a layer of skin. The intention was to suggest an evolutionary change signifying the loss of individuality in the face of advancing technology and the progressive disappearance of face-to-face, direct interaction. This series was first presented at The List Visual Arts Center at MIT, then later at the 46th Venice Biennale in 1995.

Interior series, 1999–2002
These are monumental images of architectural spaces seemingly constructed out of human skin. Created originally to metaphorically reflect the rapid proliferation of technological communications, these images have a haunting, lyrical quality which embodies the dichotomy between interior and exterior that will come to characterize their work subsequently.

Chimeras, 1998 
Chimeras is a series of six large vertical photographs that explore the fragile and material nature of human skin, shaped like scientific specimens waiting to be analyzed. The fantastical sculptural forms linger uncomfortably between aesthetics and function and in the words of artist Daniel Canogar, are presented more like "an abstract prosthetic extension of the human body."

Synaptic Bliss series, 2003–2007
The central piece in this series is a 4-channel video installation commissioned by the Festival Villette Numerique in Paris in 2004. The series is characterized by a shift in visual language from the human body to representing a landscape in which diverse forms are superimposed, becoming intertwined, and slowly emerging from an intensive colored flurry. Each individual shape seems in constant flux, becoming distinguished by a shift in tone, orientation, or size of its colored texture. The work in this series explores ideas of a digital consciousness that allows for the simultaneous perception of multiple perspectives and scales, as well as for the blurring of the distinctions between the body and its environment.

Some People, 2012 
Some People, consisting of four large scale video installations commissioned by Indianapolis Museum of Art in 2012, reflects on the violence and the longstanding political conflict in the Middle East, where both Aziz + Cucher have cultural and familial roots—Cucher was raised in a Zionist, Jewish family, who emigrated to Israel, and Aziz has extended family still living in southern Lebanon. The artists traveled to and conducted extensive research in the region and this is the first time the artists appear in their own work, expressing their need to no longer remain silent and to confront the unceasing cycle of violence and self destruction between Arabs and Jews.

Tapestry Cycle, 2014–2017 
Woven on a Jacquard loom in Belgium and fabricated by Magnolia Editions, the Tapestry Cycle revisits a historic European medium for pictorial storytelling but through a contemporary lens. The narratives that these works depict can loosely be understood as “historical paintings of the present moment.” In an interview from 2016,  the artists say that “we were really taken with the idea of creating a tapestry that was an extension of all the video work we did, but in the style of a Renaissance tapestry that deals with narrative or an event — in this case, a current event. We're interested in the politics of tapestries traditionally and historically, and how we might tap into that in a more contemporary way. Even though it's not a specific event, we wanted to compositionally refer to the tradition of tapestry making in the 16th century.” The figures represented range from the dramatic to the mundane, from the lyrical to the absurd, in an ever-shifting point of view that does not evade from the complexities and contradictions we inhabit in the contemporary world.

You're Welcome and I'm Sorry, 2019-22 
You’re Welcome and I am Sorry began as a video installation commissioned by the Massachusetts Museum of Contemporary Art (MASS MoCA) for the exhibition, Suffering From Realness held between March 31, 2019 – February 2, 2020. The work addresses the polarizing effects of inequality in the economic and political systems inherent in our country and the absurdity of recent political theater. A series of unique mixed media paintings sourced from this original project will be exhibited at Gazelli Art House in London in 2022.

Museum Collections
San Francisco Museum of Modern Art, San Francisco, California

Los Angeles County Museum of Art, Los Angeles, California

Musée de l'Élysée, Lausanne, Switzerland

MUSAC, Museum of Contemporary Art, Leon, Spain

Maison Europeene de la Photographie, Paris, France

Museo Nacional Centro de Arte Reina Sofia, Madrid, Spain

Fond National d’Art Contemporain, Paris, France

San Jose Museum of Art, San Jose, California

Museum of Contemporary Photography, Chicago

National Gallery of Australia, Canberra, Australia

Denver Museum of Art, Denver, Colorado

Fonds Regional d’Art Contemporain, Auvergne, France

Kölnischer Kunstverein, Cologne, Germany

National Art Gallery, Caracas, Venezuela

Di Rosa Center for Contemporary Art, Rene and Veronica di Rosa Foundation, Napa, California

Museo Alejandro Otero, Caracas, Venezuela

Martin Z. Margulies Collection, Miami

Kalamazoo Institute of Arts, Kalamazoo, Michigan

Exhibitions 
2019  “How the Light Gets In,” Johnson Museum, Cornell University, Ithaca, New York

2019  "Suffering From Realness," Massachusetts Museum of Contemporary Art, North Adams, MA

2015  Come As You Are: Art of the 1990s, group exhibition, Montclair Art Museum, Montclair, New Jersey

2012 Aziz + Cucher: Some People, curated by Lisa D. Freiman, Indianapolis Museum of Art

2008  "Aziz + Cucher," Stiftelsen Art Center, Bergen, Norway

2004  “Synaptic Bliss”, Villette Numerique 2004, Parc de la Villette, Paris 

2003  Only Skin Deep: Changing Visions of the American Self, International Center of Photography, New York City

2002  “PASSAGE,” Herzliya Museum of Art, Israel

2002   “Body Design”, San Francisco Museum of Modern Art 

2000  “Sharing Exoticism,” Biennale de Lyon, France

2000  “The Century of the Body,” Musee de l’Elysee, Lausanne, Switzerland

2000  “Made in California, 1900 – 2000″, Los Angeles County Museum of Art

1999 “One Hundred Years of Art in Germany,” Nationalgalerie, Berlin

1999  AZIZ + CUCHER, Museo Nacional Centro de Arte Reina Sofia, Madrid, Spain

1997  Unnatural Selection, The Photographers' Gallery, London, England

1997 Les Rencontres d’Arles, Arles, France

1995 Venice Biennale, Venezuelan Pavilion, Venice

1994  The Ghost in the Machine, List Visual Arts Center, M.I.T., Cambridge, MA

1993  “The Final Frontier,” The New Museum of Contemporary Art, New York

1992  “Faith, Honor, and Beauty,” New Langton Arts, San Francisco

Publications 
2019

“Suffering from Realness,” exhibition catalog ed. by Denise Markonish, MASS MoCA/Prestel, North Adams, MA, 2019.

“Body: The Photography Book,” ed. by Nathalie Herschdorfer, Thames and Hudson, New York, 2019. 

2016

Jean Robertson, Craig McDaniel, “Themes of Contemporary Art: Visual Art After 1980,” Oxford University Press, UK, 2016. ()

2015

Alexandra Schwartz, "Come as You Are: Art of the 1990's," University of California Press, Berkeley/Los Angeles, 2015.

2012

Lisa D. Freiman (Editor), "Some People," Indianapolis Museum of Art and Hatje Cantz, Germany, 2012.

Juliet Hacking (Editor), "Photography: The Whole Story," Thames and Hudson, London, 2012.

2010

Sylvia Wolf, Digital Eye, Prestel Editions, New York and Henry Art Gallery, Seattle, 2010.

2007

Eleanor Heartney, Art and Today, Phaidon, New York, 2007

Mary Warner Marien, Fleming's Arts & Ideas, 10th edition, Wadsworth/Thomson, 2007.

2006

Bernadette Wegenstein, “Getting Under the Skin,” MIT Press, Cambridge, 2006.

2004

Suzanne Anker, “The Molecular Gaze: Art in the Genetic Age," Cold Spring Harbor Press, NY, 2004.

2003

Coco Fusco, “Only Skin Deep”, International Center of Photography, NY, 2003. 

2002

Claudia Benthien, "Skin: On the Cultural Border Between Self and World," Columbia Univ. Press, 2002.

Mary Warner Marien, Photography: A Cultural History, Abrams and Prentice Hall, London, 2002.

Ellen Lupton, “Skin: Surface, Substance, and Design” (cat.), Cooper-Hewitt National Design Museum, 2002.

2000

William Ewing, “The Century of the Body,” Thames & Hudson, London, 2000.

1999

Michael Rush, “New Media in the Late 20th Century,” Thames & Hudson, 1999, p. 186

Tim Druckrey, in Overexposed, ed. by Carol Squiers, The New Press, New York, 1999.

1996

Photography After Photography, G+B Arts, Munich, 1996.

1995

La Biennale Di Venezia, 1995, General Catalogue, 1995.

Awards 
Pollock-Krasner Foundation, Artist Grant, 2022

Pollock-Krasner Foundation, Artist Grant, 2017

Frans Masereel Centrum Residency Award, Kasterlee, Belgium, 2016

New York Foundation for The Arts, Digital Media Fellowship, 2015

Artists in Residence, San Francisco Art Institute, San Francisco, 2014

Koopman Distinguished Chair in the Arts. Hartford Art School, 2009

New York Foundation for the Arts, Digital Media Fellowship, 2003

Pollock-Krasner Foundation, Photography Grant, 2002

Ruttenberg Award, Friends of Photography, San Francisco, 1996

John D. and Susan P. Diekman Fellowship, Djerassi Residency Program, 1993

Art Matters, Inc., New York, 1992

NEA, Western States Regional Fellowship Award (WESTAF), 1991

References

External links
 Official homepage

American artists
Living people
San Francisco Art Institute alumni
Boston College alumni
Art duos
American LGBT artists
1958 births
1961 births